Craig Gardner (born 25 November 1986) is an English professional football coach and former player who made 260 appearances in the Premier League and a further 67 in the Championship. He joined the coaching staff at Birmingham City in January 2021, and in June was appointed technical director.

A versatile midfielder, Gardner was able to play in many different positions, although he preferred central midfield. He began his career at Aston Villa before spending the 2010–11 season with city rivals Birmingham City, with whom he won the 2011 League Cup. After three seasons with Sunderland, he joined West Bromwich Albion in 2014 before rejoining Birmingham City in 2017. He retired from playing in 2020 to take up a position as first-team coach at the club. He moved on to a similar role at Sheffield Wednesday in November 2020, before leaving a month later when Tony Pulis' contract was terminated and returning to Birmingham.

Internationally, Gardner represented England at under-21 level, and was a member of the team that finished as runners-up on the 2009 European Championships.

Club career

Aston Villa

Gardner came through Aston Villa's youth system and turned professional on 31 January 2005. Gardner made his Premier League debut on 26 December 2005, when he came on as a substitute for Steven Davis against Everton at Villa Park. He scored his first professional goal for Villa in the 3–1 away win on 14 April against Middlesbrough. He also netted a contender for goal of the month on the last day of the season away to Bolton Wanderers. After a series of appearances Villa Manager Martin O'Neill entered contract talks with Gardner.

In August 2007, Gardner signed a new four-year deal, which ran until June 2011. On 1 October 2007 he scored twice in two games with two free kicks. First he scored away to Tottenham Hotspur in a 4–4 draw and then the winner against West Ham United five days later with a deflected attempt.

On 1 December 2007, Gardner scored the opener in a home match against Arsenal. Villa went on to lose the match 2–1. Gardner has often played in the right-back slot, and impressed both his manager, Martin O'Neill, and captain, Gareth Barry, who said that Gardner could be a key player for years to come.

Gardner made just one appearance for Villa in the 2009–10 season because of a groin injury. On 4 January 2010 it was announced that Birmingham City were preparing a £3.5 million bid. However it was revealed that Aston Villa had turned down the bid for the player. However, the club later offered a second deal including add-ons that was accepted by Aston Villa. He made exactly 80 appearances for Villa in all competitions.

Birmingham City
Gardner signed a four-and-a-half-year contract with Birmingham City on 26 January 2010 for a fee reported as £3m plus £500,000 in add-ons. He made his debut on 7 February as a 68th-minute substitute, and set up the first of Kevin Phillips' goals as Birmingham came back to beat Midlands rivals Wolverhampton Wanderers 2–1. He scored his first goal for the club against Everton on 13 March. Towards the end of the season Gardner was preferred to Sebastian Larsson on the right of midfield. Restored to his favoured central position, he scored twice in the first home game of the 2010–11 season as Birmingham came from behind to beat Blackburn Rovers 2–1, and scored again in the next game away at Bolton Wanderers. Gardner's winning goal in extra time against West Ham United took Birmingham City through to the 2011 Football League Cup Final, and he was in the starting eleven as Birmingham won their first major trophy since 1963. He was the team's top scorer in the 2010–11 season with eight League goals, ten in all competitions, as Birmingham were relegated to the Championship.

Sunderland

Gardner signed a three-year deal with Sunderland for an undisclosed fee, believed by BBC Sport to be about £6 million, on 30 June 2011. Gardner made his debut as a substitute in the home defeat to Newcastle United on 20 August, and scored his first competitive goal on 18 September 2011 with a deflected shot that looped over goalkeeper Asmir Begović as Sunderland beat Stoke City 4–0 at home to secure their first win of the season. Gardner fell out of favour at Sunderland, and was linked with a departure in the January transfer window. However, he was re-united with former boss O'Neill when he replaced Steve Bruce as Sunderland manager in December 2011, and this prompted a change in fortune for Gardner and the Black Cats. Gardner was deployed at right back against Manchester City on New Year's Day 2012 due to an injury crisis, and helped Sunderland to a shock 1–0 win against the league leaders. Two days later Gardner, again playing at right back, scored his second goal for Sunderland, direct from a free kick 30 yards away from goal in their 4–1 away win at Wigan. Gardner was rumoured to be homesick at Sunderland in the press, and was linked with a move back to the Midlands. Sunderland rejected a loan bid for Gardner from former club Birmingham City on 19 January. Gardner scored a stunning volley from 25 yards late on in Sunderland's 2–0 win over Swansea City on 21 January.

Gardner remained at Sunderland for the 2012–13 season, dismissing rumours that he was unsettled on Wearside. He was deployed as a right-back by O'Neill for much of the season. His first goal of the season came from a direct free kick against MK Dons in a 2–0 League Cup victory on 25 September. Gardner scored again from a free kick in a 2–4 home defeat against West Bromwich Albion, and scored the Black Cats' consolation goal in a 2–1 loss at Norwich City in December. On 5 January, Gardner scored a late equaliser in their FA Cup 3rd Round tie away at Bolton Wanderers with a powerful strike from the edge of the box, earning Sunderland a replay. He scored a penalty as Sunderland lost 2–1 at Reading in January. In March, Gardner conceded a penalty by bringing down Ashkan Dejagah in the box, but made amends by scoring another penalty to help Sunderland draw 2–2. Gardner scored yet another penalty as Sunderland drew at home to Norwich later that month, bringing his tally for the season to eight. Despite Gardner's goals, Sunderland were on a run of eight games without a win, and following a home defeat to Manchester United, O'Neill was sacked and replaced with Paolo Di Canio. Gardner started Di Canio's first game in charge, a 2–1 loss at Chelsea, and picked up his tenth yellow card of the season. As a result, Gardner missed the Tyne-Wear derby at Newcastle through suspension. However, Di Canio allowed Gardner to travel to the game with Sunderland supporters and watch the game with the fans in the away end. Gardner was seen singing with Sunderland fans on the Metro journey to Tyneside, and celebrating as Sunderland thrashed their rivals 3–0. Gardner returned to the team following his suspension, but against Stoke was shown a straight red card for a challenge on Charlie Adam, ending his season prematurely.

Gardner scored his first goal of the 2013–14 season from the penalty spot in a 3–1 home defeat to Arsenal. He also opened the scoring against Manchester United a few weeks later, although Sunderland went on to lose 2–1. Gardner scored the only goal of the FA Cup fifth-round tie against Southampton when he "unleashed a 20-yard shot which arced imperiously before brushing the underside of the bar as it dipped en route to the top corner".

West Bromwich Albion
On 20 May 2014, Gardner signed a three-year deal with West Bromwich Albion, to begin when his Sunderland contract expired at the end of the 2013–14 season. He scored his first goal for the club in a 1–0 victory against his former club Aston Villa.

Return to Birmingham City
On 11 January 2017, Gardner returned to Birmingham City on loan until the end of the season, after which the transfer would become a three-year permanent deal with an option for a fourth year. The fee was undisclosed, but the Birmingham Mail believed it to be in excess of £1 million. The deal was made permanent on 11 May 2017. He was appointed player-coach in November 2019, with the intention of becoming first-team coach on a permanent basis on 1 July 2020 after his playing contract expired. He finished his second spell with Birmingham with 73 appearances in all competitions, and over a 15-year playing career made 327 league appearances, of which 260 were in the Premier League.

International career
Gardner was a member of the England under-21 team that played at the 2009 European Championships. He appeared in two group matches and was a second-half substitute in the final, which England lost 4–0 to Germany.

Coaching career
Gardner had acted as Birmingham City's player-coach during the 2019–20 season under Pep Clotet's management, and took up a permanent position as first-team coach on 1 July. The club had announced that Clotet would leave at the end of the season, which had been extended because of the coronavirus pandemic, but after a series of poor results, he left on 8 July. Gardner and Steve Spooner finished the season in joint charge, presiding over a draw and three defeats as Birmingham avoided relegation on the final day of the season.

Gardner initially remained in post after new head coach Aitor Karanka brought in his own staff, but left the club in November to join the coaching staff at Sheffield Wednesday under newly appointed manager Tony Pulis, with whom he had worked at West Bromwich Albion. His spell lasted just over a month, as he left the club when Pulis was sacked on 28 December 2020.  He returned to Birmingham's coaching staff in early January.

Personal life
Gardner was born in Solihull and raised in the Yardley district of Birmingham, where he attended Cockshut Hill School. After transferring to Birmingham City in 2010, he said he was a lifelong Birmingham City supporter. His younger brother Gary Gardner also played for England at youth level and turned professional with Aston Villa. In June 2012, Gardner donated £500 to the family of a disabled toddler after a chance meeting in a department store; this was only revealed after the Stoke-on-Trent family told a local newspaper.

Career statistics

Honours
England U21
UEFA European Under-21 Championship runner-up: 2009

Birmingham City
Football League Cup: 2010–11

References

External links

1986 births
Living people
Sportspeople from Solihull
English footballers
England under-21 international footballers
Association football midfielders
Aston Villa F.C. players
Birmingham City F.C. players
Sunderland A.F.C. players
West Bromwich Albion F.C. players
Premier League players
English Football League players
Association football coaches
Birmingham City F.C. non-playing staff
Sheffield Wednesday F.C. non-playing staff